Brighton railway station is the southern terminus of the Brighton Main Line in England, and the principal station serving the city of Brighton, East Sussex.

The station is managed by Govia Thameslink Railway, which operates all of the services.

It was built by the London & Brighton Railway in 1840–41, initially only connecting Brighton to Shoreham-by-Sea, westwards along the coast, in May 1840. It finally connected a year later inland to Haywards Heath and London Bridge in September 1841 via the just-completed Clayton Tunnel; and then in 1846 to the county town of Lewes to the east via the London Road Viaduct. The railway became the London, Brighton & South Coast Railway in 1846 following mergers with other railways with lines between Portsmouth and Hastings.

With over 17 million passenger entries and exits in 2018/19, Brighton is the seventh-busiest station in the country outside London.

History and development
The London & Brighton Railway (L&BR) built a passenger station, goods station, locomotive depot and railway works on a difficult site on the northern edge of Brighton.

Passenger station

The passenger station was a three-storey building in an Italianate style, designed by David Mocatta in 1839–40 which incorporated the head office of the railway company. (This building still stands but has been largely obscured by later additions.) The station is said to have many similarities to the Nine Elms railway station of the London and Southampton Railway (1838) designed by Sir William Tite. Baker & Son were paid £9766 15s for the station building between May and August 1841. The platform accommodation was built by John Urpeth Rastrick and consisted of four pitched roofs each . It opened for trains to Shoreham on 12 May 1840, and to London on 21 September 1841.
 

The station site was extended for the opening of the Brighton Lewes and Hastings Railway on 8 June 1846 (which had been purchased by the L&BR in 1845). In July 1846, the L&BR merged with other railways to form the London, Brighton & South Coast Railway.

Further extensions to the station occurred during the mid-19th century but only a limited number of additional platforms could be added because of the awkward sloping site. By the late 1870s the facilities were inadequate for the growing volume of traffic and so the existing platforms were lengthened to be able to accommodate two trains, and the three separate roofs were replaced by an overall roof during 1882/1883.

The station has an impressive large double-spanned curved glass and iron roof covering all of the platforms, which was substantially renovated in 1999 and 2000.

At the front of the station is a bus station. The station taxi rank is outside the rear of the station. A tunnel runs under the station which once provided an open-air cab run at a shallower gradient than Trafalgar Street outside, which had been the main approach to the station before the construction of Queen's Road (which was financially supported by the railway, and intended to improve access). The cab run was covered (forming a tunnel) when the station above was extended over it on cast iron columns. The cab run remains in situ but has been sealed at the station end.

Help, a dog used to collect charitable donations, was displayed at the station following its death in 1891.

Goods station and yard
A goods station and yard was also constructed on the eastern side of the passenger station but on a site  due to the sloping site, which was initially accessed from the Shoreham line by a second tunnel under the passenger station. The tunnel entrance was filled in after new tracks were laid into the goods yard, but a portion of it was converted into offices during World War II, and these were in use until the early 21st century. A portion of the tunnel is still used by a local rifle club. The site of the goods yard has since been redeveloped, and much of it forms the New England Quarter.

Locomotive and carriage works
To the north of the station, on the east side of the main line, the railway constructed its locomotive and carriage works, which operated from 1841 until 1911, when the carriage works was moved to Lancing and 1957 when the locomotive works closed. Thereafter Isetta cars were briefly built in a part of the works.

Locomotive depot

The London & Brighton Railway opened a small locomotive shed and servicing facility to the north west of the station for locomotives on the Shoreham line, in May 1840, and another, adjacent to the locomotive works for main line locomotives, the following year.
During 1860–1861 John Chester Craven, the Locomotive Superintendent of the London Brighton and South Coast Railway (LB&SCR) began the removal of a large chalk hill to the north of the station, which had been dumped during the excavation of the main line. The space created was used to accommodate a new much enlarged motive power depot in 1861, replacing the two existing facilities. During the early 1930s, following the electrification of the lines the steam motive power depot was rebuilt and reduced in size. It was closed 15 June 1961, but remained in use for stabling steam locomotives until 1964, and was demolished in 1966.

The site is currently the Network Rail's ECR and infrastructure maintenance depot, and Southern's Lovers Walk Depot, used for servicing most of Southern's single voltage Class 377 and Class 313 fleets.

Listed status
Brighton station was listed at Grade II* on 30 April 1973. As of February 2001, it was one of 70 Grade II*-listed buildings and structures, and 1,218 listed buildings of all grades, in the city of Brighton and Hove.

Platform layout
The station has 8 platforms, numbered 1 to 8 from left to right when looking from the main entrance. All platforms are long enough to accommodate 12-car trains, except platform 1 which can only hold up to 10 carriages.

 Platforms 1 and 2 can only be used by services on the West Coastway line.
 Platform 3 is the only platform that can be used by services on all three lines, although trains on the West Coastway Line are limited to 4 carriages in length; services on the Brighton main and East Coastway lines are not restricted. The signalling also allows this platform to be occupied by two units on two separate lines at the same time, with a West Coastway train at the near end of the platform and a Brighton main or East Coastway train (up to 4 carriages long) at the far end.
 Platforms 4-8 can be used by services on the Brighton Main Line and the East Coastway line. However, this usage can be changed at times of disruption.

Services

Current services

Services at the station are as follows.

Southern
The typical off-peak service in trains per hour is:
 2 tph to 
 1 tph to  via 
 1 tph to 
 1 tph to 
 2 tph to Hove

Gatwick Express
The typical off-peak service in trains per hour is:

Thameslink
The typical off-peak service in trains per hour is:
 2 tph to  via ,  and 
 2 tph to  via Gatwick Airport, London Bridge and 

On Sundays, the service to Cambridge is reduced to hourly.

Former operators and services

The following companies have served Brighton in the past:
 London & Brighton Railway
 London, Brighton & South Coast Railway
 Southern Railway
 British Rail
 CrossCountry
 South West Trains
 Virgin CrossCountry
 Connex South Central
 Wessex Trains
 Thameslink (original)
 First Capital Connect
 Great Western Railway

Until 1967 a service operated between Brighton and Birkenhead Woodside via Redhill, Reading, Oxford, Birmingham Snow Hill, Wolverhampton Low Level, Shrewsbury and Chester. The stock was provided on alternate days by British Railways successors to the Southern Railway and the Great Western Railway being the Southern Region and Western Region.

Until December 2007, South West Trains operated regular services to Reading and Paignton via Worthing and Chichester.

Until May 2018, Brighton was served by an hourly service to Ashford International via Eastbourne. Now, all Ashford trains run from Eastbourne.

Until May 2022, Great Western Railway operated limited services to Bristol Temple Meads and beyond.

Disruptions to services from the station 
Football matches at the Falmer Stadium are served by train services from Brighton to Falmer. A queuing system is in operation from 2 hours before kick off for trains departing from platforms 7 and 8. The stadium's 31,800 capacity means these queues are large close to kick off. After the game, fans leave the station via the emergency gates, and a queuing system is in operation for West Coastway Line services departing from platforms 1 and 2.

The Lewes Bonfire night, usually on 5 November, attracts large numbers of people, many travelling through Brighton station. As a result, Southern operate a queuing system from the afternoon onwards.

The London to Brighton Bike Ride in June each year attracts large numbers of cyclists. As a result, Southern ban bicycles from many trains on the day, and on the following day they operate a queuing system at Brighton station. The train operators had in the past allowed bicycles on trains for the many cyclists returning to London.

Facilities 
Passenger facilities include a ticket office, a travel information office, and several retail outlets. There are bus stops, a taxi rank, a car park and bicycle storage.  Facilities for cyclists were extended in 2014 when a "cycle hub" was built at the rear entrance to the station.  The three-storey building combines storage space for 500 bicycles with shops to buy or hire a bicycle, a repair facility, toilets, showers, changing facilities and a café.  It is open 24 hours a day and storage is free of charge; most funding came from the Department for Transport (£500,000), Network Rail (£200,000), local rail operator Southern and the city council (£100,000 each).

In 2012 £4.5 million was secured from the Department for Transport's Station Commercial Project Facility for renovation of the concourse. Changes included an increased number of ticket barriers, improved layout, more seating and retail outlets and the removal of the previous WH Smiths structure.

In 2021, a tactile map was installed, in collaboration with the Royal National Institute of Blind People, to help blind and partially sighted passengers navigate the station.

Train Crew Depots
Both Southern and Thameslink have Driver, On Board Supervisor and Conductor depots at Brighton station.

Accidents
On 4 August 1909, a motor-train hauled by Terrier No.83 Earlswood collided with the buffers at Brighton, due to the driver's error. Nineteen people were injured.

Arthur Wellesley, 2nd Duke of Wellington, died at the station on 13 August 1884.

Concourse 
The concourse includes food shops, cafés, a newsagent and other food and retail outlets. The front of the station often sees stalls and street food vans. Following a request by Labour MP Peter Kyle in 2014, Southern added a street piano to the concourse, with a vintage Southern Railway logo inscribed.

See also
 Transport in Brighton and Hove
 London to Brighton in Four Minutes – BBC short film of early 1950s showing speeded-up train journey

Notes

References
Citations

Sources

Further reading

External links

 Pages from My Brighton and Hove
 Kent Rail's page on Brighton station
 YouTube video of trains arriving/departing in 1995
 Brighton Station 
 Brighton Station page at Southern Railway

David Mocatta railway stations
Former London, Brighton and South Coast Railway stations
Grade II* listed buildings in Brighton and Hove
Grade II* listed railway stations
Railway stations in Brighton and Hove
Railway stations in Great Britain opened in 1840
Railway stations served by Govia Thameslink Railway
DfT Category B stations